Big Rock Township is located in Kane County, Illinois.  As of the 2010 census, its population was 1,859 and it contained 717 housing units. Most of its land use is agricultural.

Geography

U.S. Route 30 runs east to west through the township.

Cities and towns
 Big Rock

Demographics

Images

Notes

References

External links
 Big Rock Township Assessor
 Official Village of Big Rock website
 Big Rock Forest Preserve
 Big Rock Park District
 Hinckley-Big Rock CUSD 429

1849 establishments in Illinois
Big Rock, Illinois
Townships in Kane County, Illinois
Townships in Illinois